This is a list of number one singles on the Billboard Brasil Hot Popular Songs 100 chart in 2012. Note that Billboard publishes a monthly chart.

Chart history

See also
Billboard Brasil
List of number-one pop hits of 2011 (Brazil)
Crowley Broadcast Analysis

References

Brazil Hot Popular
2012 Hot 100